Fayaz Ali Butt is a Pakistani politician who had been a Member of the Provincial Assembly of Sindh, from May 2013 to May 2018.

Early life and education
He was born on 2 May 1974 in Mehar Taluka.

He has a degree of Master of Arts  and a degree of Bachelor of Laws, both from Sindh University.

Political career

He was elected to the Provincial Assembly of Sindh as a candidate of Pakistan Peoples Party (PPP) from Constituency PS-77 DADU-IV in 2013 Pakistani general election. In August 2016, he was into Sindh's provincial cabinet of Chief Minister Syed Murad Ali Shah and was made Provincial Minister of Sindh for Public Health and Rural Development.

He was re-elected to Provincial Assembly of Sindh as a candidate of PPP from Constituency PS-84 (Dadu-II) in 2018 Pakistani general election.

References

Living people
Sindh MPAs 2013–2018
1974 births
Pakistan People's Party MPAs (Sindh)
Sindh MPAs 2018–2023